Barbara A. McNamara (born circa 1942) is an American linguist. She was the NSA's Deputy Director from October 1997 until June 2000. She was succeeded by William B. Black, Jr.

Biography
McNamara joined the NSA in 1963 as a linguist working with Chinese. She rose through a number of analytic, operational, and managerial positions before leaving the Operational Directorate in 1983. McNamara became the first woman to be named Deputy Director of Operations in 1994. In 1997 she became the second woman to be named the agency's deputy director. In June 2000, she received the US Intelligence Community's highest award, the National Intelligence Distinguished Service Medal. At the time she was one of the highest ranked women in the United States intelligence community. She served as the NSA's Senior U.S. Liaison Officer in London, England shortly before her retirement in 2003.

In 2020, she was inducted into the NSA Hall of Honor.

References

Living people
Year of birth missing (living people)
Linguists from the United States
Women linguists
Deputy Directors of the National Security Agency
People from Clinton, Massachusetts
Recipients of the National Intelligence Distinguished Service Medal